The 2014 United States Senate election in New Hampshire was held on November 4, 2014, to elect a member of the United States Senate to represent the state of New Hampshire, concurrently with the election of the governor of New Hampshire, as well as other elections to the United States Senate in other states and elections to the United States House of Representatives and various state and local elections.

Incumbent Democratic Senator Jeanne Shaheen ran for re-election to a second term in office. Primary elections were held on September 9, 2014. Shaheen was unopposed for the Democratic nomination and the Republicans nominated former U.S. Senator Scott Brown, who represented Massachusetts from 2010 to 2013.

Brown sought to become only the third person in history and the first in 135 years to represent more than one state in the United States Senate. Waitman T. Willey represented Virginia from 1861 to 1863 and West Virginia from 1863 to 1871 and James Shields represented Illinois from 1849 to 1855, Minnesota from 1858 to 1859 and Missouri in 1879. Since the 17th Amendment, which mandated the popular election of senators as opposed to selection by state legislatures, was ratified in 1913, Brown would have been the first person popularly elected as a U.S. senator in two different states.

Shaheen defeated Brown by 51.5% to 48.2%, making him the first man to lose two Senate races to women, as he had lost his 2012 reelection bid in Massachusetts to Elizabeth Warren.

Democratic primary 
Shaheen was unopposed for the Democratic nomination.

Candidates

Declared 
 Jeanne Shaheen, incumbent U.S. Senator

Endorsements

Results

Republican primary 
The Republican primary for this election was much more highly contested than the respective Democratic one, with Scott Brown beating out Jim Rubens and Bob Smith for the Republican nomination.

Candidates

Declared 
 Gerard Beloin, candidate for New Hampshire's 2nd congressional district in 2012 and candidate for the U.S. Senate in 2010
 Scott Brown, former U.S. Senator from Massachusetts
 Robert D'Arcy
 Miroslaw "Miro" Dziedzic, candidate for New Hampshire's 2nd congressional district in 2012
 Mark W. Farnham, candidate for the U.S. Senate in 1992
 Bob Heghmann
 Walter W. Kelly
 Andy Martin, perennial candidate
 Jim Rubens, Chairman of the Granite State Coalition Against Expanded Gambling, former State Senator and candidate for Governor in 1998
 Bob Smith, former U.S. Senator, and candidate for President in 2000

Withdrew 
 Karen Testerman, conservative activist and candidate for Governor in 2010 (endorsed Smith)

Declined 
 Richard Ashooh, candidate for New Hampshire's 1st congressional district in 2010
 Al Baldasaro, state representative
 Charles Bass, former U.S. Representative
 Bill Binnie, industrialist, investment banker and candidate for the U.S. Senate in 2010
 Jeb Bradley, Majority Leader of the New Hampshire Senate and former U.S. Representative
 David M. Cote, Chairman and CEO of Honeywell
 Judd Gregg, former U.S. Senator and former governor of New Hampshire
 Frank Guinta, former U.S. Representative (ran for NH-01)
 Daniel Innis, Dean of the Peter T. Paul College of Business and Economics at the University of New Hampshire (ran for NH-01)
 Ovide Lamontagne, businessman, candidate for the U.S. Senate in 2010 and nominee for Governor in 1996 and 2012
 Andy Sanborn, state senator
 Mark Steyn, conservative author and political commentator
 Chris Sununu, Executive Councillor, son of former Governor John H. Sununu and brother of former U.S. Senator John E. Sununu (ran for re-election)
 John E. Sununu, former U.S. Senator
 Fred Tausch, businessman
 Fran Wendelboe, former state representative and candidate for New Hampshire's 1st congressional district in 2002

Endorsements

Polling

Results

General election

Debates 
 Complete video of debate, October 21, 2014
 Complete video of debate, October 23, 2014

Fundraising

Independent expenditures

Predictions

Polling

Results 
The race was close throughout the night. However, with 57% of the vote in MSNBC was comfortable enough with Shaheen's lead to declare her the victor. Brown called Shaheen to concede at 11:32 P.M. EST. Shaheen won with a 3.3% margin of victory over Brown, securing a majority of the votes cast by over 1%.

See also 
 2014 United States Senate elections
 2014 United States elections
 2014 United States House of Representatives elections in New Hampshire
 2014 New Hampshire gubernatorial election

References

External links 
 U.S. Senate elections in New Hampshire, 2014 at Ballotpedia
 Scott Brown vs Jeanne Shaheen graph of multiple polls from HuffPost Pollster
 Campaign contributions at OpenSecrets

2014
New Hampshire
2014 New Hampshire elections